Alberto Ortega Martín (born 14 November 1962) is a Spanish prelate of the Catholic Church who works in the diplomatic service of the Holy See.

Biography
Alberto Ortega Martín was born in Madrid, Spain, on 14 November 1962. He was ordained a priest of the Archdiocese of Madrid on 28 April 1990 by Cardinal Ángel Suquía Goicoechea.

On 1 July 1997, he joined the diplomatic service of the Holy See and worked in Nicaragua, South Africa, and Lebanon. Beginning in 2004 he worked in Rome at the Secretariat of State, where in 2007 he was given responsibility for the Holy See's representation in North Africa and the Arabian Peninsula.

On 1 August 2015, Pope Francis appointed him titular archbishop of Midila (Algeria) and apostolic nuncio to Jordan and Iraq. He received his episcopal consecration on 10 October 2015 from Cardinal Pietro Parolin.

On 7 October 2019 he was named apostolic nuncio to Chile.

See also
 List of heads of the diplomatic missions of the Holy See

References

External links 

 Catholic Hierarchy: Archbishop Alberto Ortega Martín 

Living people
1962 births
People from Madrid
Diplomats of the Holy See
Pontifical Ecclesiastical Academy alumni
Apostolic Nuncios to Jordan
Apostolic Nuncios to Iraq
Communion and Liberation
Apostolic Nuncios to Chile